Juan Lopez is a paralympic athlete from Spain competing mainly in category T20 sprint events.

Juan competed at the 2000 Summer Paralympics in Sydney, Australia.  He competed in the high jump and long jump and won a silver medal in the T20 100m behind compatriot José António Exposito and won the T20 400m gold medal.

References

Paralympic athletes of Spain
Athletes (track and field) at the 2000 Summer Paralympics
Paralympic gold medalists for Spain
Paralympic silver medalists for Spain
Living people
Medalists at the 2000 Summer Paralympics
Year of birth missing (living people)
Paralympic medalists in athletics (track and field)
Spanish male sprinters
Spanish male long jumpers
Spanish male high jumpers